Below is the list of national team rosters for the 1991 Canada Cup ice hockey tournament.

Canada
Coaches

Players

Finland

Players

Sweden

Players

United States

Coaches

Players

USSR

Players

Czechoslovakia

Players

Canada Cup rosters
1991 in ice hockey